Daron is a given name and surname. In Western Armenian, Daron is an alternative to the Armenian name Taron. Notable people with the name include:

Given name
Daron Alcorn (born 1971), American football player
Daron Beneby (born 1984), Bahamian soccer player
Daron Clark (born 1985), American football player
Daron Council (born 1964), American sprinter
Daron Cruickshank (born 1985), American mixed martial artist
Daron Cruickshank (cricketer) (born 1986), Trinidadian cricketer 
Daron Hagen (born 1961), American composer
Daron Kirkreit (born 1972), American baseball pitcher
Daron Joffe (born 1975),  agribusiness and nonprofit executive 
Daron Jones (born 1976), American singer-songwriter
Daron Ker,  Cambodian-American filmmaker 
Daron Murphy, film composer and musician
Daron Norwood (1965–2015), American country music singer
Daron Payne (born 1997), American football player
Daron Roberts (born 1978), American football coach
Daron Rahlves (born 1971), American alpine skier
Daron Schoenrock (born 1961), American college basketball coach
Daron Sutton (born 1969), American sports announcer

DaRon
DaRon Bland (born 1999), American football player
DaRon Holmes, American basketball player
DaRon McGee, American politician

Armenian name (Daron or Taron)
Daron Acemoglu (born 1967), Armenian-American economist 
Daron Malakian (born 1975), Armenian-American musician
Taron Margaryan (born 1978), Armenian politician and Mayor of Yerevan
Taron Voskanyan (born 1993), Armenian football player

Surname
Anatoliy Daron (1926-2020), Russian rocket engineer and scientist 
David Daron (1397–1410), Dean of Bangor
Lewys Daron (fl. c. 1495 – c. 1530), Welsh-language professional poet

See also
Darron, given name
Darin (name), given name and surname
Deron, given name